Iwan Tukalo (born 5 March 1961) is a former Scotland international rugby union player. His regular playing position was Wing.

Rugby Union career

Amateur career

The son of a Ukrainian father and Italian mother, Tukalo was educated at the Royal High School, Edinburgh He went on to play for Royal HSFP.

Tukalo then moved to play for Selkirk.

Provincial career

Tukalo played for Edinburgh District in the Scottish Inter-District Championship.

On moving to Selkirk, Tukalo then played for South of Scotland.

Tukalo played for the Whites Trial side on 7 January 1984.

The following year Tukalo moved up in contention and played for the Blues Trial side in their first match against the Reds Trial side. He was selected for Blues again in 1986, the Reds winning that match. In the subsequent fixture on 3 January 1987, he was again named in the Blues side against the Reds - and scored the Blues first try.

In January 1988 Tukalo first played for the Reds Trial side.

International career

Tukalo was capped by Scotland 'B' to play against France 'B' on 7 February 1982. He secured 5 'B' caps in total.

Tukalo won his first cap against Ireland and his last against Australia. He scored a total of 15 tries during his international career. 

Tukalo won 37 caps for his country between 1985 and 1992. He was part of the Grand Slam winning team in 1990.

Tukalo has a solitary Scotland 'A' cap which he obtained in the 'A' side's first match, against Spain in 1990.

Coaching career

Tukalo coached the Heriots side in the Scottish Premiership Division One and is currently not involved with rugby at senior level.

Business career

Tukalo was awarded his MBA from the University of Edinburgh Business School.

Tukalo now has a second career working for Scottish And Southern Energy as sales and development director.

References

1961 births
Living people
Scottish rugby union players
Scotland international rugby union players
People educated at the Royal High School, Edinburgh
Rugby union wings
Scottish people of Ukrainian descent
Italian Scottish rugby union players
Scotland 'B' international rugby union players
Scotland 'A' international rugby union players
Royal HSFP players
Selkirk RFC players
Edinburgh District (rugby union) players
South of Scotland District (rugby union) players
Blues Trial players
Reds Trial players
Rugby union players from Edinburgh
Whites Trial players